Virginia Vance (July 1, 1902 -  October 13, 1942) was a silent film actress in the United States. She married actor Bryant Washburn.

She was born in Chicago and raised in Toronto, Canada. She appeared in some 90 films including comedy shorts, serials, and features including in leading roles. She appeared in Cameo Comedies with Cliff Bowes. She is knocked over by a custard pie in the 1926 film His Private Life.

In 1929 she married and left filmmaking. She had a daughter. She died of heart issues and is buried at Chapel in the Pines cemetery in Los Angeles.

Filmography
Goat Getter (1925) as Mamie Arthur
Cheer Up (1924)
The Fighting Dude (1925)
What's Up? (1925)
Fool's Luck (1926)
Home Cured (1926)
The Fighting Marine (1926) as Ruby
His Private Life (1926)
My Stars (1926) as The Girl 
Undressed (1928) as Marjorie Stanley
New Year's Eve as  Little Girl's Mother

References

1902 births
1942 deaths
American silent film actresses
20th-century American actresses
Actresses from Chicago